is a Japanese manga series written and illustrated by Fujihiko Hosono. It was serialized in Shogakukan's shōnen manga magazine Weekly Shōnen Sunday from March 1981 to February 1982, with its chapters collected in four tankōbon volumes. A twenty-seven-episode anime television series adaptation by Pierrot was broadcast on Fuji TV from October 1998 to June 1999.

Story
Dokkiri Doctor chronicles events in the life of Dr. Haruka Nishikikōji, a humorous overweight school doctor who manages his school's clinic and health center, a medieval castle–like complex situated on the school's rooftop, and the crazy and unique inventions he conjures to impress his childhood friend and pretty nurse, Miyuki Koizumi, and to assist his students, but which often lead to a large amount of highly embarrassing and funny situations and adventures for the doctor, Miyuki and the students and the teachers of his school.

Characters

 

An overweight and endearing school doctor who has made it his mission in life to assist his students in any way he can. Secretly in love with his childhood friend and pretty nurse, Miyuki, Dr. Haruka conjures up unique but crazy inventions meant to help his students and impress Miyuki but which often lead to humorous, funny and very embarrassing situations for the doctor, Miyuki and the students and teachers of his school. Managing a medieval castle-like clinic and health center, Dr. Haruka has often tried to express his feelings for Miyuki, but is thwarted by both his shyness and the consequences of his crazy inventions. In episode 10 of the anime series, Dr. Haruka's weight was measured by his saliva detector (an invention which could deduce the height and weight of a person by detecting his saliva, which he created to search the school for a phantom food thief (later found to be a hungry germ) to be 105 kg.
 

A childhood friend of Dr. Haruka and the pretty nurse of the school's clinic and health center. When the doctor's inventions go wrong, as is often the case, Miyuki often helps Dr. Haruka fix and correct their unsatisfactory consequences. She is highly skilled in martial arts, often winning several competitions.
 

Miyuki's younger sister, and a student at the school.
 

A student of the school and Mayumi's classmate, with whom he has a crush.

One of the male teachers at the school. A sly person who is often an unwilling victim of Dr. Haruka's inventions, he is a close confidante of the vice principal, with whom he often unites to find ways of getting Dr. Haruka fired from the school.

The vice principal of the school and is a collector of ancient antique artifacts, many of which face the brunt of the embarrassing consequences of Dr. Haruka's crazy inventions.  His favorite bakers are Nanahoshu, as detailed in episode 10.

The muscular and strong male teacher at the school who isn't afraid of exposing his muscular body.  Actually, He often tries unsuccessfully to woo Miyuki.

A female teacher at the school.  A delicate person, she often faints when faced with the shocking situations that often occur due to Dr. Haruka's inventions.

A little girl who is a student at the school who is often helped by the kind and lovable doctor.  She has a crush on her friend Gen.
 

A little boy who is a student at the school and a friend of Kaori. He is also quite popular with his female classmates.

The school's principal.
The hungry germs, Tai, Shoku and Kin, were a group of germs created by Dr. Haruka.

Media

Manga
Written and illustrated by Fujihiko Hosono, Dokkiri Doctor was serialized in Shogakukan's shōnen manga magazine Weekly Shōnen Sunday from March 18, 1981, to February 3, 1982. Shogakukan collected its chapters in four tankōbon volumes, released from October 19, 1981, to April 19, 1982.

Volume list

|}

Anime
A 27-episodes anime television series adaptation produced by Pierrot and SPE Visual Works aired on Fuji TV between October 21, 1998, and June 23, 1999. For the first 19 episodes (episodes 1–19), the ending theme was I Wish by Electric Combat, and the ending theme used for the last ten episodes (episodes 20–26) was Make it Somehow by LUKA.

References

External links
Studio Pierrot's official Dokkiri Doctor website  
Fuji TV's official Dokkiri Doctor website 
 

1981 manga
1998 anime television series debuts
Animax original programming
Aniplex
Comedy anime and manga
Fuji TV original programming
Medical anime and manga
School life in anime and manga
Shogakukan manga
Shōnen manga
Pierrot (company)
Works by Fujihiko Hosono